Portugal selected their entry for the Eurovision Song Contest 1996 through the annual Festival da Canção.

Before Eurovision

Festival da Canção 1996 
 1996 was the 34th edition of  that selected Portugal's entry for the Eurovision Song Contest 1996. Ten entries competed in the contest that was held on 7 March 1996 at 20:30 GMT at Teatro Politeama in Lisbon and was broadcast on RTP1 and RTP Internacional. The winner was selected through the votes of 10 regional juries of Portugal. The winner was Lúcia Moniz with the song "O meu coração não tem cor". In addition to the performances of the competing entries, 1993 Portuguese representative Anabela performed as guest.

At Eurovision 
In 1996, for the only time in Eurovision history, an audio-only qualifying round of the 29 songs entered (excluding hosts Norway who were exempt) was held in March in order for the seven lowest-scoring songs to be eliminated before the final. Moniz placed 18th with 32 points, thus qualifying for the final.

On the night of the contest, Moniz performed 4th, following Spain and preceding Cyprus. Although the song was in second place in the voting at best, at the end of the voting Moniz received 92 points, finishing 6th out of 23 competing countries. This was Portugal's best placing at the contest in its history until Salvador Sobral's victory 21 years later.

Voting

Qualifying round

Final

Notes

References

External links
Portuguese National Final 1996

1996
Countries in the Eurovision Song Contest 1996
Eurovision